Toothpaste for Dinner is a webcomic created by Drew Fairweather. The comic was launched on January 1, 2002.

A new strip is posted several times a week at 12:01 AM, EST. Each comic features small, simple drawings, paired with short captions or dialogue. The style of humor on Toothpaste for Dinner encompasses surrealism, irony, social commentary, cynicism, and schadenfreude, among other types of humor. Each cartoon is entirely self-contained (except in certain cases of a series, such as the horoscope series.)

Art
The art for Toothpaste for Dinner is drawn with ink on paper (Uni-Ball Micro pens and 300 lb. wt. Bristol board illustration paper). Although the art is primarily black and white, a color comic is occasionally posted. The art style, although minimalist, stands out due to its disjointed style. The artist often draws people with misaligned eyes, and only three, flipper-like fingers. The comic has been illustrated by contractors since 2010, so that Fairweather can focus on his other projects: "The Worst Things for Sale" and his rap career as Crudbump.

Reception
Sam Anderson of Slate described Toothpaste for Dinner as "the most addictive comic on the Web." Whitney Reynolds, producer of PC Magazine, said that the webcomic showed "beauty in simplicity," and supported Anderson's claim of the Toothpaste for Dinners addictive nature.

Books
The Drew Book
Mad Drew: Beyond Coffeedome
Toothpaste for Dinner: hipsters, hamsters and other pressing issues, 2005

See also
Married to the Sea

References

External links 
 Official site

2000s webcomics
Webcomics in print
2002 webcomic debuts